Bull Street is a major street  in Savannah, Georgia, United States. Named for Colonel William Bull (1683–1755), it runs from Bay Street in the north to Derenne Avenue (part of State Route 21) in the south. It is around 3.40 miles in length, not including the section interrupted by Forsyth Park. It is the center of a National Historic Landmark District.

Savannah City Hall sits opposite the northern end of Bull Street, on Bay Street.

Bull Street goes around five of Savannah's 22 squares. They are (from north to south):

Johnson Square
Wright Square
Chippewa Square
Madison Square
Monterey Square

A memorial in the Oglethorpe Avenue median marks what is today known as the Bull Street Cemetery, with a plaque stating: "Original 1733 burial plot allotted by James Edward Oglethorpe to the Savannah Jewish Community". On November 3, 1761, George III "conveyed a certain half lot of land in Holland Tything, Percival Ward, to David Truan." This land was at the northwest corner of today's Bull Street and Oglethorpe Avenue. Several Jews were interred here before the family cemeteries were established.

Notable buildings and structures

Below is a selection of notable buildings and structures on Bull Street, all in Savannah's Historic District. From north to south:

The Gingerbread House, a popular tourist attraction, is at 1921 Bull Street, opposite Bull Street Library. It was built by Cord Asendorf Sr. in 1899.

References in popular culture
The street is also featured several times in John Berendt's 1994 book Midnight in the Garden of Good and Evil. In the introduction to the subsequent 1997 movie, Irma P. Hall's character Minerva says to a squirrel sat beside her on a bench in Forsyth Park: "Quit eyeballin' me, Flavis. I knew you when you was a two-bit hustler on Bull Street."

References

External links
Bull Street – Savannah.com

Roads in Savannah, Georgia
Streets in Georgia (U.S. state)